Sara Haile, better known by her stage name Sa'ra Charismata, is a Swedish-Eritrean singer and songwriter.

Early life
Sa'ra Charismata's parents fled the conflict in 1970s Eritrea, finding sanctuary in Sweden where she was born and raised. Growing up across three continents, Sa'ra Charismata devoted her adolescent years addressing challenging issues pertaining to racial, economic and gender inequalities through music, field activism and legal practice, primarily in The United States.

Career
Charismata began her music career in 2004 while she attended college at the University of Northern Colorado. In college, Charismata spearheaded the campus organization The Summit Organizing Committee on Social Justice and Diversity (SOC) and during that time her music was mainly acoustic and political in nature. After college, Charismata intended to continue her political career so she attended law school at Fordham University School of Law in New York City. However, in 2013, once she had earned her Juris Doctor degree, Charismata left the legal field to fully pursue a career in music instead. In 2015, Charismata gave a TEDx talk where she spoke of her journey going from the legal field to fully embracing a career in music.

Having spent the majority of her artist career as an independent artist, in 2015, Charismata signed a record deal with Virgin Records Sweden after she independently released  "Mushroom," her most popular song yet, gaining the attention of radio and record label executives in Sweden. In her song "Mushroom," a high-energy punk-pop tune, Charismata uses references to Super Mario Brothers characters like Koopa Troopa to draw comparison to the current social order and political climate, begging the question, who is really in control?

In 2014, Charismata was nominated Rookie Artist of the Year at the Denniz Pop Awards alongside Tove Lo and listed as "a name to watch for" by Sweden's leading music journalist Jan Gradvall.

Musical style and influences

Charismata described her early style of music as "Protest Pop," a term she coined herself. Afropunk has previously described Charismata as "the quintessential revival of the modern protest song in pop music" and "an outspoken voice that mainstream media may never acknowledge."

Charismata cites the careers of Bob Marley, Bad Brains, and John Lennon as her biggest inspirations. Charismata is also known for her high-energy live performances influenced by the 1980s New York punk scene. She has performed at large-scale festivals such as Roskilde Festival in Denmark and Peace & Love Festival in Sweden.

Whereas Charismata's previous work has been mainly political in nature, her more recent work also includes more personal lyrics.

Singles discography

References

Living people
Swedish women singer-songwriters
University of Northern Colorado alumni
Fordham University alumni
Swedish people of Eritrean descent
21st-century Swedish women singers
Year of birth missing (living people)